Philip Poole may refer to:

 Phillip Poole (born 1981), English ice dancer and ice dance coach
 Philip Poole (bishop), suffragan bishop in the Anglican Diocese of Toronto, Canada